Asia Urbs Programme - humanitarian development programme, funded by EuropeAid Co-operation Office of the European Commission. It aimes at a decentralised (city-to-city) cooperation between Europe and Asia. Established in 1998. The programme provided grants to local governments, non-governmental organizations for every aspect of urban life and municipal planning developing. 

The budget is € 33.2 million (I Phase) and €10 million (II Phase from 2004). The Programme involved many of the Asian countries, including China, Cambodia, India, Vietnam, Thailand, Bangladesh and others.

Objectives
 promote mutual understanding between Asia and Europe,
 support the alleviation of poverty,
 develop economic partnerships.

Key areas of cooperation
 Urban management
 Urban socio-economic development
 Urban environment
 Urban social infrastructure

The Program was closed for proposals in 2005, but some of its projects are ongoing.

References

External links
Asia Urbs Programme

International development agencies
Foreign relations of the European Union